Victor-Maurice, comte de Broglie (12 March 16474 August 1727) was a French soldier and general.

Victor-Maurice de Broglie was born in the  De Broglie house, a noble family originally from Piedmont. He was the  son of François-Marie, comte de Broglie and Angelique de Vassal, Countess of Favria. After the death of his father  he inherited the countships of Revel  and de Broglie, the marquisate of Senonches and  also received the Government of La Bassee, near Lille.

He served under Condé, Turenne, and other commanders of the age of Louis XIV in the Franco-Dutch War and other conflicts.

He was named maréchal de camp in 1676, lieutenant-general in 1688, and finally marshal of France in 1724, just three years before his death.

He had three sons, one of whom predeceased him.  The second son, Charles-Guillaume, marquis de Broglie, was his heir, while the third son, François-Marie, a general and a marshal of France like his father, became the first duc de Broglie.

References

Marshals of France
Counts of Broglie
Victor-Maurice
French people of Italian descent
1647 births
1727 deaths